, commonly referred to as simply Y.S.C.C. or Y.S.C.C. Yokohama (Y.S.C.C.横浜 or simply YS横浜, Wai Esushishi Yokohama or simply Wai Esu Yokohama) is a Japanese multisports club based in Yokohama, Kanagawa Prefecture. Although they compete in a number of different sports, YSCC is best known for its association football team that currently plays in J3 League, Japanese third tier of professional football.

History

The club was formed in 1986 by former ANA players under the name Yokohama Soccer & Culture Club. The "S" was changed to "Sports" in 2002.

Y.S.C.C. Yokohama was the starting point for many Yokohama Flügels and Yokohama F. Marinos players. When the Flügels folded in 1999, they supported the creation of Yokohama FC to replace them.

In 2012 they played Japan Football League for the first time and finished in 6th position.

After two seasons spent at JFL, YSCC Yokohama play in newly formed league, J3 from 2014. The club currently 10th consecutive seasons of third tier in 2023 season.

League and cup record

Key

Honours
Kanto Soccer League champions (4)
Japanese Regional Champions (1)

Current squad
.

Coaching staff
For the 2023 season.

Kit evolution

Managerial history

References

External links
  

 
Football clubs in Japan
Association football clubs established in 1986
Multi-sport clubs in Japan
Sports teams in Yokohama
1986 establishments in Japan
J.League clubs
Japan Football League clubs